The 1971 IIHF European U19 Championship was the fourth playing of the IIHF European Junior Championships.

Group A 
Played in Presov, Czechoslovakia from December 27, 1970, to January 3, 1971.

Norway should have been relegated to Group B for 1972, but were not because Romania declined their promotion.

Tournament Awards
Top Scorer: Martin Karlsson  (17 Points)
Top Goalie: Vladislav Tretiak
Top Defenceman:Pekka Rautakallio
Top Forward: Martin Karlsson

Group B 
Played in Bucharest, Romania from December 27, 1970, to January 3, 1971.

Romania should have been promoted to Group A for 1972, but they declined.

References

Complete results

Junior
IIHF European Junior Championship tournament
International ice hockey competitions hosted by Czechoslovakia
International ice hockey competitions hosted by Romania
1970–71 in Czechoslovak ice hockey
Sport in Prešov
1970–71 in Romanian ice hockey
December 1970 sports events in Europe
January 1971 sports events in Europe
Sports competitions in Bucharest
1970s in Bucharest